Polycornum is a genus of lichenized fungi in the family Porinaceae.

References

Ostropales
Lichen genera
Ostropales genera